Metalampra is a genus of the concealer moth family (Oecophoridae). Among these, it belongs to subfamily Oecophorinae. It was originally established as a subgenus of Borkhausenia.

Species of Metalampra include:
 Metalampra cinnamomea (Zeller, 1839)
 Metalampra italica
 Metalampra diminutella (Rebel, 1931)

Footnotes

References
  (2004): Butterflies and Moths of the World, Generic Names and their Type-species – Metalampra. Version of 2004-NOV-05. Retrieved 2010-APR-28.
  (2001): Markku Savela's Lepidoptera and some other life forms – Metalampra. Version of 2001-NOV-07. Retrieved 2010-APR-28.

Oecophoridae